Accreditation Council for Pharmacy Education (ACPE) is a non-profit accreditation national agency recognized by Council on Higher Education Accreditation and the US Department of Education. It was established in 1932 as the American Council on Pharmaceutical Education and was renamed as the Accreditation Council for Pharmacy Education in 2003. ACPE is based in Chicago and accredits and pre-accredits schools offering PharmD degrees and providers of continuing pharmacy education. The accrediting body is  made up of professionals from the American Council on Education, the American Association of Colleges of Pharmacy, the American Pharmacists Association, and the National Association of Boards of Pharmacy.

See also
 List of recognized accreditation associations of higher learning
 Higher education accreditation in the United States
 List of pharmacy schools in the United States
 List of pharmacy schools

References

External links 
 

Pharmacy organizations in the United States
School accreditors in Chicago
Non-profit organizations based in Chicago
Organizations established in 1932
Councils